Arinaga (written: 有永 or 有栄) is both a Japanese surname and a masculine Japanese given name. Notable people with the name include:

, Japanese footballer
, Japanese handball player
, Japanese samurai

Japanese-language surnames
Japanese masculine given names